Maa Annayya is a 2000 Indian Telugu-language drama film directed by Ravi Raja Pinisetty. The film stars Dr. Rajasekhar and Meena with Brahmaji, Vineeth, Deepti Bhatnagar and Naasar in supporting roles. The film's soundtrack was composed by S. A. Rajkumar. The film was released in 2000 to positive reviews. The film was a remake of the Tamil film Vaanathaipola (2000). The film was declared a super hit at the box office.

Cast

Production
Rajasekhar initially wanted Muthyala Subbaiah to direct the film. The film began production under the name Maa Manchi Annayya before the name was shortened to Maa Annayya.

Soundtrack
Soundtrack was composed by S. A. Rajkumar who composed the original Tamil film.  The song "Maa Logililo Pandedantha" is based on "Dil Deewana" from the Hindi film Daag (1999).

Release
A critic from Full Hyderabad opined that "The film is good to watch with all the fun and laughter".

References

2000 films
2000s Telugu-language films
Indian family films
Indian drama films
Telugu remakes of Tamil films
Films scored by S. A. Rajkumar
Films directed by Ravi Raja Pinisetty